The women's 100 metres hurdles at the 2002 European Athletics Championships were held at the Olympic Stadium on August 8–9.

Medalists

Results

Heats
Qualification: First 2 of each heat (Q) and the next 6 fastest (q) qualified for the semifinals.

Wind:Heat 1: +0.5 m/s, Heat 2: 0.0 m/s, Heat 3: -0.3 m/s, Heat 4: +0.3 m/s, Heat 5: +1.1 m/s

Semifinals
Qualification: First 4 of each semifinal (Q) qualified directly for the final.

Wind:Heat 1: 0.0 m/s, Heat 2: +0.6 m/s

Final
Wind: -0.7 m/s

External links

100
Sprint hurdles at the European Athletics Championships
2002 in women's athletics